The Gujarati people or Gujaratis, are an Indo-Aryan ethnolinguistic group who reside in or can trace their ancestry or heritage to the present-day western Indian state of Gujarat. They primarily speak Gujarati, an Indo-Aryan language. While Gujaratis mainly inhabit Gujarat, they have a diaspora worldwide. Many notable independence activists were Gujarati, including Gandhi, Patel, and Jinnah.

Geographical locations
Despite significant migration primarily for economic reasons, most Gujaratis in India live in the state of Gujarat in Western India. Gujaratis also form a significant part of the populations in the neighboring metropolis of Bombay and union territory of Dadra and Nagar Haveli and Daman and Diu, which was a former Portuguese colony. There are very large Gujarati immigrant communities in other parts of India, most notably in Mumbai, Pune, Delhi, Kolkata, Chennai, Bangalore and other cities like Kochi. All throughout history Gujaratis have earned a reputation as being India's greatest merchants, their direct role in slavery and slave trading in East Africa is skillfully occluded in most writing that commemorated the Gujarati mercantile elite, industrialists and business entrepreneurs and have therefore been at forefront of migrations all over the world, particularly to regions that were part of the British empire such as Fiji, Hong Kong, Malaya, East Africa and South Africa. Diasporas and transnational networks in many of these countries date back to more than a century. In recent decades, larger numbers of Gujaratis have migrated to English-speaking countries such as the United Kingdom, Australia, New Zealand, Canada and the United States.

History

In anthropological surveys conducted in India about 60% of the people claim that their community is a migrant to their state or region. In Gujarat that number is around 70%. In the state, 124 Hindu communities out of 186 claim a migrant past. For example, the Audichya Brahmins claim migration from present day Uttar Pradesh. With Muslims in Gujarat, 67 out of 86 communities claim a migrant past.

Early European travelers like Ludovico di Varthema (15th century) traveled to Gujarat and wrote on the people of Gujarat. He noted that Jainism had a strong presence in Gujarat and opined that Gujaratis were deprived of their kingdom by Mughals because of their kind heartedness. His description of Gujaratis was:

In 1790 and 1791, an epidemic devastated numerous parts of Gujarat during which 100,000 Gujaratis were killed in Surat alone.

An outbreak of bubonic plague in 1812 has been claimed to have killed about half the Gujarati population.

Social stratification
Orthodox Gujarati society, which was mercantile by nature, was historically organized along ethno-religious lines and shaped into existence on the strength of its Mahajan ("guild assemblies"), and for its institution of Nagarsheth ("head of the guild assembly"); a 16th-century Mughal system akin to medieval European guilds which self-regulated the mercantile affairs of multi-ethnic, multi-religious communities in the Gujarati bourgeoisie long before municipal state politics was introduced. Historically, Gujaratis belonging to numerous faiths and castes, thrived in an inclusive climate surcharged by a degree of cultural syncretism, in which Hindus and Jains dominated occupations such as shroffs and brokers whereas, Muslims, Hindus and Parsis largely dominated sea shipping trade. This led to religious interdependence, tolerance, assimilation and community cohesion ultimately becoming the hallmark of modern-day Gujarati society.

Religion
The Gujarati people are predominantly Hindu. There are also minority of Muslims, Jains, Christians, Sikhs, Buddhists, Jews, and followers of the Baháʼí Faith.

Hindu communities
The major communities in Gujarat are traditional agriculturalist (such as Patidar, Koli), traders (such as Bania, Bhatia, Soni), sailor and seafood exporters Kharwa, Artisan communities (such as Prajapati, Sindhi Mochi), Brahmin communities (such as Joshi, Anavil, Nagar, Modh, Shrimali), other farming communities (such as Charan, Rabari, Bharvad), Genealogist communities (such as Barots), Kshatriya communities (such as Koli Thakor, Bhanushali, Choudhary jats, Rajput, Kathi Darbars, Karadia, Nadoda, Dabhi, Chudasama, (Ahir,gurjar), Lohana, Maher), Tribal communities (such as Bhils, Meghwal and Kolis, Gamit, Konkani, varli) and Devipujak (such as Dataniya, Dantani, Chunara, Patni).

Muslim communities

The majority of Gujarati Muslims are Sunni Muslim. Minority communities include Twelver, Nizari Ismailis, Daudi Bohra, Khoja.

Diaspora
Gujaratis have a long tradition of seafaring and a history of overseas migration to foreign lands, to Yemen Oman Bahrain, Kuwait, Zanzibar and other countries in the Persian Gulf since a mercantile culture resulted naturally from the state's proximity to the Arabian Sea. The countries with the largest Gujarati populations are Pakistan, United Kingdom, United States, Canada and many countries in Southern and East Africa. Globally, Gujaratis are estimated to comprise around 33% of the Indian diaspora worldwide and can be found in 129 of 190 countries listed as sovereign nations by the United Nations. Non Resident Gujaratis (NRGs) maintain active links with the homeland in the form of business, remittance, philanthropy, and through their political contribution to state governed domestic affairs.

Gujarati parents in the diaspora are not comfortable with the possibility of their language not surviving them. In a study, 80% of Malayali parents felt that "children would be better off with English", compared to 36% of Kannada parents and only 19% of Gujarati parents.

Pakistan

There is a large community of Gujarati Muslims mainly settled in the Pakistani province of Sindh for generations. Community leaders say there are 3,500,000 speakers of Gujarati language in Karachi. Significant Gujarati communities existed here before 1947 Partition of India. Many of them migrated after the Partition of India and subsequent creation of Pakistan in 1947.  These Pakistani Gujaratis belong mainly to the Ismāʿīlī, Khoja, Dawoodi Bohra, Chundrigar, Charotar Sunni Vohra, khatri Muslims Kutchi Memons and Khatiawari Memons; however, many Gujaratis are also a part of Pakistan's small but dying Hindu community. Famous Gujaratis of Pakistan include Muhammed Ali Jinnah (father of Pakistan), Ibrahim Ismail Chundrigar (sixth Prime Minister of Pakistan), Sir Adamjee Haji Dawood (philanthropist), Abu Bakr Osman Mitha (Major-General), Abdul Razzak Yaqoob (philanthropist), Javed Miandad (Pakistani cricketer), Abdul Sattar Edhi (humanitarian), Abdul Gaffar Billoo (philanthropist), Ramzan Chhipa (philanthropist), Tapu Javeri (Pakistani fashion and art photographer), Pervez Hoodbhoy (Pakistani nuclear physicist),  Dipak Bardolikar (poet).

Sri Lanka 

There is relatively a large number of Gujarati Muslims settled in Sri Lanka. They mainly represent the Dawoodi Bhora and the Memon community, and there is also a minority of Sindhi people in Sri Lanka. These communities are mainly into trading businesses and lately, they have diversified into different trades and sectors. Gujarati Muslims started their trading route between India and Ceylon (Sri Lanka) in the late 1880s. Great number of Gujarati Muslims migrated after the Partition of India in 1947. These communities are well known for their social welfare activities in Sri Lanka. In addition, Gujarati Muslims have shown their excellence in business and various trades by developing large enterprises in Sri Lanka. Few of them are: Expolanka, Brandix, Amana Bank of Sri Lanka, Adam Group, Akbar Tea, Timex Garments, and Abans Group. Members of these community maintain their Indian Gujarati culture in their every day life. Bhoras speak the Gujarati language and follow Shia Islam and the Memon people speak the Memon language and they follow the Sunni Hanafi Islam.

United States

The United States has the second-largest Gujarati diaspora after Pakistan. The highest concentration of the population of over 200,000 is in the New York City Metropolitan Area, notably in the growing Gujarati diasporic center of India Square in Jersey City, New Jersey, and Edison in Middlesex County in Central New Jersey. Significant immigration from India to the United States started after the landmark Immigration and Nationality Act of 1965. Early immigrants after 1965 were highly educated professionals. Since US immigration laws allow sponsoring immigration of parents, children and particularly siblings on the basis of family reunion, the numbers rapidly swelled. A number of Gujarati are twice or thrice-migrant because they came directly from the former British colonies of East Africa or from East Africa via Great Britain respectively Given the Gujarati propensity for business enterprise, a number of them opened shops and motels. While they may make up only around 0.1% of the population in the United States, Gujarati Americans control over 40% of the hospitality market in the country, for a combined net worth of over US$40 billion and employing over one million employees. Gujaratis, especially the Patidar samaj, also dominate as franchisees of fast food restaurant chains such as Subway and Dunkin' Donuts. The descendants of the Gujarati immigrant generation have also made high levels of advancement into professional fields, including as physicians, engineers and politicians.

Notable Gujarati Americans include Sunita Williams (NASA Astronaut), Ami Bera (United States Congress), Reshma Saujani (American politician), Sonal Shah (economist to Whitehouse), Raj Shah (White House Deputy Press Secretary under President Trump), Rohit Vyas (Indian American journalist), 
Bharat Desai (CEO Syntel), Vyomesh Joshi (Forbes), Raj Bhavsar (sports) Halim Dhanidina (first Muslim judge of California), Savan Kotecha (Grammy nominated American songwriter), and Hollywood actresses, Sheetal Sheth and Noureen DeWulf.  Kal Penn,  actor, author, and civil servant.

Europe

United Kingdom

Gujaratis have had a long involvement with Britain. The original East India Company set up a factory (trading post) in the port city of Surat in Gujarat in 1615. These were the beginnings of first real British involvement with India that eventually led to the formation of the British Raj.
The third largest overseas diaspora of Gujaratis, after Pakistan and United States, is in the United Kingdom. At a population of around 800,000 Gujaratis form almost more than half of the Indian community who live in the UK (1.2 million). Gujaratis first went to the UK in the 19th century with the establishment of the British Raj in India. Prominent members of this community such as Shyamji Krishna Varma played a vital role in exerting political pressure upon colonial powers during the Indian independence movement.

The present day Gujarati diaspora in the UK is mostly the second and third generation descendants of "twice-over" immigrants from the former British colonies of East Africa, Portugal, and Indian Ocean Islands. Most of them despite being British Subjects had restricted access to Britain after successive Immigration acts of 1962, 1968 and 1971. Most were, however, eventually admitted on the basis of a Quota voucher system or, in case of Uganda, as refugees after the expulsion order by the Ugandan ruler, Idi Amin in August 1972.
 
Gujaratis in Britain are regarded as affluent middle-class peoples who have assimilated into the milieu of British society. They are celebrated for revolutionizing the corner shop, and energising the British economy which changed Britain's antiquated retail laws forever. Demographically, Hindus form a majority along with a significant number of Jains and Muslims, and smaller numbers of Gujarati Christians. They are predominantly settled in metropolitan areas like Greater London, East Midlands, West Midlands, Lancashire and Yorkshire. Cities with significant Gujarati populations include Leicester and London boroughs of Harrow, Barnet and Brent. There is also a small, but vibrant Gujarati-speaking Parsi community of Zoroastrians present in the country, dating back to the bygone era of Dadabhai Navroji, Shapurji Saklatvala and Pherozeshah Mehta. Both Hindus and Muslims have established caste or community associations, temples, and mosques to cater for the needs of their respective communities. A well known temple popular with Gujaratis is the BAPS Swaminarayan Temple in Neasden, London. A popular mosque that caters for the Gujarati Muslim community in Leicester is the Masjid Umar. Leicester has a Jain Temple that is also the headquarters of Jain Samaj Europe. The Shree Prajapati Association is a charity, already thriving in East Africa, which has 13 branches in the U.K. and is strongly dependent on support from the Gujarati community in

Gujarati Hindus in the UK have maintained many traditions from their homeland. The community remains religious with more than 100 temples catering for their religious needs. All major Hindu festivals such as Navratri, Dassara, and Diwali are celebrated with a lot of enthusiasm even from the generations brought up in UK. Gujarati Hindus also maintain their caste affiliation to some extent with most major castes having their own community association in each population center with significant Gujarati population such as Leicester and London suburbs. Patidars form the largest community in the diaspora including Kutch Leva Patels, followed closely by Lohanas of Saurashtra origin. Gujarati Rajputs from various regional backgrounds are affiliated with several independent British organizations dependent on caste such as Shree Maher Samaj UK, and the Gujarati Arya Kshatriya Mahasabha-UK.

Endogamy remains important to Gujarati Muslims in UK with the existence of matrimonial services specifically dedicated to their community. Gujarati Muslim society in the UK have kept the custom of Jamat Bandi, literally meaning communal solidarity. This system is the traditional expression of communal solidarity. It is designed to regulate the affairs of the community and apply sanctions against infractions of the communal code. Gujarati Muslim communities, such as the Ismāʿīlī, Khoja, Dawoodi Bohra, Sunni Bohra, and Memon have caste associations, known as jamats that run mosques and community centers for their respective communities.

India becoming the predominant IT powerhouse in the 1990s has led to waves of new immigration by Gujaratis, and other Indians with software skills to the UK.

In 2005, the Gujarat Studies Association was formed in order to raise awareness about research being conducted on the Gujaratis - their patron is Lord Bhikhu Parekh.

Belgium
Two Gujarati business communities, the Palanpuri Jains and the Kathiawadi Patels from Surat, have come to dominate the diamond industry of Belgium. They have largely displaced the Orthodox Jewish community which previously dominated this industry in Belgium.

Portugal
The 1961 takeover of Portuguese Goa by India made life difficult for the Indian population in the then Portuguese colony of Mozambique. The independence of Mozambique like in other African countries led to many Gujaratis to move to Portugal. Many Hindu Gujaratis have moved from Portugal to Great Britain since the 1990s.

Canada

Canada, just like its southern neighbour, is home to a large Gujarati community. As per the 2021 Canadian census, Gujarati Canadians number approximately 210,000 and account for roughly 0.6% of Canada's population. The majority of them live in Toronto and its suburbs - home to the second largest Gujarati community in North America, after the New York Metropolitan Area. Gujarati Hindus are the second largest linguistic/religious group in Canada's Indian community after Punjabi Sikhs, and Toronto is home to the largest Navratri raas garba festival in North America. The Muslim Ismaili Khoja form a significant part of the Canadian diaspora estimated to be about 80,000 in numbers overall. Most of them arrived in Canada in the 1970s as either refugees or immigrants from Uganda and other countries of East Africa.

Notable Gujarati Canadians include Naheed Nenshi (36th Mayor of Calgary), Bharat Masrani (CEO of TD Bank Group), Zain Verjee (CNN journalist), Ali Velshi (former CNN, current MSNBC journalist), Rizwan Manji (Canadian actor), Avan Jogia (Canadian actor), Richie Mehta (Canadian film director), Nazneen Contractor (Canadian actress), Ishu Patel (BAFTA-winning Animations director), Arif Virani (Member of Parliament for Parkdale-High Park), Rahim Jaffer (Member of Parliament for Edmonton-Strathcona), Omar Sachedina (CTV News anchor) and Prashant Pathak (Investor and Philanthropist).

East Africa
Former British colonies in East Africa had many residents of South Asian descent. The primary immigration was mainly from Gujarat and to a lesser extent from Punjab. They were brought there by the British Empire from India to do clerical work in Imperial service, or unskilled and semi-skilled manual labour such as construction or farm work. In the 1890s, 32,000 labourers from British India were brought to the then British East African colonies under indentured labour contracts to work on the construction of the Uganda Railway that started in the Kenyan port city of Mombasa and ended in Kisumu on Kenyan side of Lake Victoria. Most of the surviving Indians returned home, but 6,724 individuals decided to remain in the African Great Lakes after the line's completion.

Many Asians, particularly the Gujaratis, in these regions were in the trading businesses. They included Gujaratis of all religions as well many of the castes and Quoms. Since the representation of Indians in these occupations was high, stereotyping of Indians in Kenya, Uganda, and Tanganyika as shopkeepers was common. A number of people worked for the British run banks. They also worked in skilled labor occupations, as managers, teachers and administrators. Gujarati and other South Asians had significant influence on the economy, constituting 1% of the population while receiving a fifth of the national income. For example, in Uganda, the Mehta and Madhvani families controlled the bulk of the manufacturing businesses. Gated ethnic communities served elite healthcare and schooling services. Additionally, the tariff system in Uganda had historically been oriented toward the economic interests of South Asian traders. One of the oldest Jain overseas diaspora was of Gujarat. Their number was estimated at 45,000 at the independence of the East African countries in the early 1960s. Most members of this community belonged to Gujarati speaking Halari Visa Oshwal Jain community originally from the Jamnagar area of Saurashtra.

The countries of East Africa gained independence from Britain in the early 1960s. At that time most Gujarati and other Asians opted to remain as British Subjects. The African politicians at that time accused Asians of economic exploitation and introduced a policy of Africanization. The 1968 Committee on "Africanisation in Commerce and Industry" in Uganda made far-reaching Indophobic proposals. A system of work permits and trade licenses was introduced in 1969 to restrict the role of Indians in economic and professional activities. Indians were segregated and discriminated against in all walks of life. During the middle of the 1960s many Asians saw the writing on the wall and started moving either to UK or India. However, restrictive British immigration policies stopped a mass exodus of East African Asians until Idi Amin came to power in 1971. He exploited pre-existing Indophobia and spread propaganda against Indians involving stereotyping and scapegoating the Indian minority. Indians were stereotyped as "only traders" and "inbred" to their profession. Indians were labelled as "dukawallas" (an occupational term that degenerated into an anti-Indian slur during Amin's time), and stereotyped as "greedy, conniving", without any racial identity or loyalty but "always cheating, conspiring and plotting" to subvert Uganda. Amin used this propaganda to justify a campaign of "de-Indianization", eventually resulting in the expulsion and ethnic cleansing of Uganda's Indian minority.

Kenya
Gujarati and other Indians started moving to the Kenya colony at the end of the 19th century when the British colonial authorities started opening up the country with the laying down of the railroads. A small colony of merchants, however, had existed on the port cities such Mombasa on the Kenyan coast for hundreds of years prior to that. The immigrants who arrived with the British were the first ones to open up businesses in rural Kenya a century ago. These dukanwalas or shopkeepers were mainly Gujarati (Mostly Jains and Hindus and a minority of Muslims). Over the following decades the population, mainly Gujarati but also a sizable number of Punjabi, increased in size. The population started declining after the independence of Kenya in the 1960s. At that time the majority of Gujaratis opted for British citizenship and eventually moved there, especially to cities like Leicester or London suburbs. Famous Kenyans of Gujarati heritage who contributed greatly to the development of East Africa include Thakkar Bapa, Manu Chandaria, Atul Shah, Baloobhai Patel, Bhimji Depar Shah (Forbes), Naushad Merali (Forbes), and Indian philanthropist, Alibhai Mulla Jeevanjee, who played a large role in the development of modern-day Kenya during colonial rule.

Uganda

There is a small community of people of Indian origin living in Uganda, but the community is far smaller than before 1972 when Ugandan ruler Idi Amin expelled most Asians, including Gujaratis. In the late 19th century, mostly Sikhs, were brought on three-year contracts, with the aid of Imperial British contractor Alibhai Mulla Jeevanjee to build the Uganda Railway from Mombasa to Kisumu by 1901, and to Kampala by 1931. Some died, while others returned to India after the end of their contracts, but few chose to stay. They were joined by Gujarati traders called "passenger Indians", both Hindu and Muslim free migrants who came to serve the economic needs of the indentured labourers, and to capitalise on the economic opportunities.

After the 1972 expulsion, most Indians and Gujaratis migrated to the United Kingdom. Due to the efforts of the Aga Khan, many Khoja Nizari Ismaili refugees from Uganda were offered asylum in Canada.

Tanzania

Indians have a long history in Tanzania starting with the arrival of Gujarati traders in the 19th century. There are currently over 50,000 people of Indian origin in Tanzania. Many of them are traders and they control a sizeable portion of the Tanzanian economy. They came to gradually control the trade in Zanzibar. Many of the buildings constructed then still remain in Stone Town, the focal trading point on the island.

South Africa

The Indian community in South Africa is more than a 150 years old and is concentrated in and around the city of Durban. The vast majority of immigrant pioneer Gujaratis who came in the latter half of the 19th century were passenger Indians who paid for their own travel fare and means of transport to arrive and settle South Africa, in pursuit of fresh trade and career opportunities and as such were treated as British subjects, unlike the fate of a class of Indian indentured laborours who were transported to work on the sugarcane plantations of Natal Colony in dire conditions. Passenger Indians, who initially operated in Durban, expanded inland, to the South African Republic (Transvaal), establishing communities in settlements on the main road between Johannesburg and Durban. After wealthy Gujarati Muslim merchants began experiencing discrimination from repressive colonial legislation in Natal, they sought the help of one young lawyer, Mahatma Gandhi to represent the case of a Memon businessman. Umar Hajee Ahmed Jhaveri was consequently elected the first president of the South African Indian Congress.
Indians in South Africa could traditionally be bifurcated as either indentured labourers (largely from Tamil Nadu, with smaller amounts from UP and Bihar) and merchants (exclusively from Gujarat).

Peculiarities of the South African Gujarati diaspora include high amounts of Southern Gujaratis and a disproportionately high amount of Surti Sunni Vohra and Khatiawari Memons. Post apartheid, a sizeable number of new immigrants have settled in various parts of South Africa, including many  Gujarati.

Indians have played an important role in the anti-apartheid movement of South Africa. Many were incarcerated alongside Nelson Mandela following the Rivonia Trial, and many became martyred fighting to end racial discrimination. Notable South African Indians of Gujarati heritage include Marxist freedom fighters such as Ahmed Timol (activist), Yusuf Dadoo (activist), Ahmed Kathrada (activist), Amina Cachalia (activist) and Dullah Omar (activist), as well as Ahmed Deedat (missionary), Imran Garda (Al Jazeera English) and Hashim Amla (cricketer).

Mozambique
In the second half of the 1800s, many Gujarati Hindus belonging to the Vaniya community migrated to the South of Mozambique, in particular to the provinces of Inhambane and Lourenço Marques to run businesses. This was followed by migration of Hindus of various artisan castes from Diu to the region. Later in 1800s, immigration restrictions imposed by the colonial authorities in neighboring South Africa and the Boer republic made Mozambique the preferred destination for many Gujarati Hindus from the Saurashtra (namely, Rajkot and Porbandar) and Surat regions.

The 1961 takeover of Portuguese Goa by India made life difficult for the Indian population in the then Portuguese colony of Mozambique. The independence of Mozambique like in other African countries led to many Gujaratis to move to Portugal.

Oman

Oman, holding a strategically important position at the mouth of the Persian Gulf, has been the primary focus of trade and commerce for medieval Gujarati merchants for much of its history and Gujaratis, along with various other ethnic groups, founded and settled its capital port city, Muscat. Some of the earliest Indian immigrants to settle in Oman were the Bhatias of Kutch, who have had a powerful presence in Oman dating back to the 16th century. At the turn of the 19th century, Gujaratis wielded enough clout that Faisal bin Turki, the great-grandfather of the current ruler, spoke Gujarati and Swahili along with his native Arabic and Oman's sultan Syed Said (1791-1856) was persuaded to shift his capital from Muscat to Zanzibar, more than two thousand miles from the Arabian mainland, on the recommendation of Shivji Topan and Bhimji families who lent money to the Sultan. In modern times, business tycoon Kanaksi Khimji, from the famous Khimji family of Gujarat was conferred title of Sheikh by the Sultan, the first ever use of the title for a member of the Hindu community. The Muscati Mahajan is one of the oldest merchants associations founded more than a century ago.

Southeast Asia
Gujaratis had a flourishing trade with Southeast Asia in the 15th and 16th centuries, and played a pivotal role in establishing Islam in the region. Miller (2010) presented a theory that the indigenous scripts of Sumatra (Indonesia), Sulawesi (Indonesia) and the Philippines are descended from an early form of the Gujarati script. Tomé Pires reported a presence of a thousand Gujaratis in Malacca (Malaysia) prior to 1512. The Gujarati language continues to be spoken in Singapore and Malaysia.

Hong Kong
The Gujarati community in Hong Kong is tiny but nevertheless contributed to progress and growth of Hong Kong over the years.

The Hong Kong University: 
In 1911 a Gujarati Parsi businessman in Hong Kong, Sir Hormusjee Naorojee Mody donated HK$150,000 towards the construction and HK$30,000 towards other costs to build the Hong Kong University.

Star Ferry: 
Dorabjee Naorojee Mithaiwala founded of the Kowloon Ferry Company in 1888 for transporting passengers and cargo (especially bread) between Kowloon and Hong Kong Island. The company was renamed in 1898 to Star Ferry, which today transports passengers throughout Hong Kong.

Ruttonjee Hospital: 
Jehangir Hormusjee Ruttonjee born in a Gujarati Parsi family in Mumbai moved to Hong Kong in 1892 to join his father. Ruttonjee donated a great deal of money to build Ruttonjee Sanatorium, now Ruttonjee Hospital, to fight against tuberculosis.

Gujaratis also dominate the diamond trade in the city. As of 2012 350 diamond firms in Hong Kong were owned by Gujaratis.

Malaysia

There estimated around 31,500 Gujarati in Malaysia. Most of this community work as traders and settled in the urban parts of Malaysia like Melaka, George Town, Kuala Lumpur and Ipoh.

Culture

Literature

The history of Gujarati literature may be traced to 1000 AD. Since then literature has flourished until date. Well known laureates of Gujarati literature are Jhaverchand Meghani, Avinash Vyas, Hemchandracharya, Narsinh Mehta, Gulabdas Broker, Akho, Premanand Bhatt, Shamal Bhatt, Dayaram, Dalpatram, Narmad, Govardhanram Tripathi, Mahatma Gandhi, K. M. Munshi, Umashankar Joshi, Suresh Joshi, Pannalal Patel, Imamuddin Khanji Babi Saheb (Ruswa Majhalumi), Niranjan Bhagat, Rajendra Keshavlal Shah, Raghuveer Chaudhari and Sitanshu Yashaschandra Mehta.

Kavi Kant, Kalapi and Abbas Abdulali Vasi are Gujarati language poets. Ardeshar Khabardar, Gujarati-speaking Parsi who was president of Gujarati Sahitya Parishad was a nationalist poet. His poem, Jya Jya Vase Ek Gujarati, Tya Tya Sadakal Gujarat (Wherever a Gujarati resides, there forever is Gujarat) depicts Gujarati ethnic pride and is widely popular in Gujarat.

Gujarat Vidhya Sabha, Gujarat Sahitya Sabha, and Gujarati Sahitya Parishad are Ahmedabad based literary institutions promoting the spread of Gujarati literature.
Saraswatichandra is a novel by Govardhanram Tripathi. Writers like Harindra Dave, Suresh Dalal, Jyotindra Dave, Dinkar Joshi, Prahlad Brahmbhatt, Tarak Mehta, Harkisan Mehta, Chandrakant Bakshi, Vinod Bhatt, Kanti Bhatt, Makarand Dave, and Varsha Adalja have influenced Gujarati thinkers.

Swaminarayan paramhanso, like Bramhanand, Premanand, contributed to Gujarati language literature with prose like Vachanamrut and poetry in the form of bhajans. Kanji Swami a spiritual mystic who was honored with the title, 'Koh-i-Noor of Kathiawar' made literary contributions to Jain philosophy and promoted Ratnatraya.

Gujarati theatre owes a lot to bhavai. Bhavai is a musical performance of stage plays. Ketan Mehta and Sanjay Leela Bhansali explored artistic use of bhavai in films such as Bhavni Bhavai, Oh Darling! Yeh Hai India and Hum Dil De Chuke Sanam. Dayro (gathering) involves singing and conversation reflecting on human nature.

Gujarati language is enriched by the Adhyatmik literature written by the Jain scholar, Shrimad Rajchandra and Pandit Himmatlal Jethalal Shah. This literature is both in the form of poetry and prose.

Cuisine

Gujarati food has famously been described as "the haute cuisine of vegetarianism" and meals have a subtle balance of sweet, tart and mild hot sensations on the palate. Gujarati Jains, many Hindus and Buddhist in Gujarat are vegetarian. However, many Gujarati Hindu communities such as Ghanchi, Koli Patel, and Kharwa consume fish as part of their diet. Christians, and Muslims have traditionally eaten a variety of meats and seafood, although Muslims don't eat pork and Hindus don't eat beef. Gujarati cuisine follows the traditional Indian full meal structure of rice, cooked vegetables, lentil dal or curry and roti. The different types of flatbreads that a Gujarati cooks are rotli or chapati, bhakhri, puri, thepla, rotla, dhebara, maal purah, and puran-pohli. Popular snacks such as Khaman, Dhokla, Dhokli, dal-dhokli, Undhiyu, Jalebi, fafda, chevdoh, Muthia, Bhajia, Patra, bhusu, locho, sev , fafda gathiya, vanela gathiya and Sev mamra, Sev Khaman, Dabeli are traditional Gujarati dishes savoured by many communities across the world.

Khichdi – a mix of rice and mung dal, cooked with spice – is a popular and nutritious dish which has regional variations. Quite often the khichdi is accompanied by Kadhi. It is found satisfying by most Gujaratis, and cooked very regularly in most homes, typically on a busy day due to its ease of cooking. It can also become an elaborate meal such as a thali when served with several other side dishes such as a vegetable curry, yogurt, sabzi shaak, onions, mango pickle and papad.

Spices have traditionally been made on grinding stones, however, since villages have seen rapid growth and industrialization in recent decades, today people may use a blender or grinder. People from north Gujarat use dry red chili powder, whereas people from south Gujarat prefer using green chili and coriander in their cooking. There is no standard recipe for Gujarati dishes, however the use of tomatoes and lemons is a consistent theme throughout Gujarat.
Traditionally Gujaratis eat mukhwas at the end of a meal to enhance digestion, and desserts such as aam shrikhand made using mango salad and hung curd are very popular. In many parts of Gujarat, drinking chaas (chilled buttermilk) or soda after lunch or dinner is also quite common.

Surti delicasies include ghari which is a puri filled with khoa and nuts that is typically eaten during the festival Chandani Padva. Khambhat delicacies include famous sutarfeni – made from fine strands of sweet dough (rice or maida) garnished with pistachios, and halwasan which are hard squares made from broken wheat, khoa, nutmeg and pistachios. A version of English custard is made in Gujarat that uses cornstarch instead of the traditional eggs. It is cooked with cardamom and saffron, and served with fruit and sliced almonds. Gujarati families celebrate Sharad Purnima by having dinner with doodh-pauva under moonlight.

Folk dance and music
The folk dances of Gujurat are Garba, Dandiya Padhar, Dangi and Tippani etc. which are done during festivals.

Gujarati folklore 
Folklores are important part of Gujarati culture. The folktales of Kankavati are religious in nature because they sprung from the ordinary day-to-day human cycle of life independent of, and sometimes deviating from the scriptures. They are part of the Hindu rituals and practices for marriage, baby shower, naming ceremony, the harvest and death, and are not merely religious acts but they reflect the lived life of people in rural and urban societies. The anthologies of Dadaji Ni Vato and Raang Chhe Barot are pragmatic with practical and the esoteric wisdom. Saurashtra Ni Rasdhar is a collection of love legends and depicts every shade of love and love is the main emotion which makes human world beautiful because it calls forth patience, responsibility, sense of commitment and dedication. Also the study of Meghani's works is quintessential because he was a trailblazer in exploring the vast unexplored heritage of Gujarati folklore. His folktales mirrors milieu of Gujarat, dialects, duhas, decors, humane values, sense of sacrifice and spirit of adventure, enthusiasm and, of course, the flaws in people. Meghani's folktales are verbal miniature of Gujarati culture.

Notable people

Business people

 Savji Dholakia

Politicians

Social activists

Arts and entertainment

Science and technology
Pranav Mistry, computer scientist and inventor of SixthSense  
Sam Pitroda (Communication Revolution)
Vikram Sarabhai, considered the "father of India's space programme".

Gallery

Images

See also
 Jethwa Rajputs
 Rajputs of Gujarat
 Dharasana Satyagraha
 Navnirman Andolan
 Mahagujarat Movement
Hind Swaraj or Indian Home Rule
 Genetic studies on Gujarati people
Khatiawari Memons

References

Further reading

External links

 
Ethnic groups in India
Social groups of Pakistan
Social groups of Gujarat
Gujarati culture
Culture of Kollam
Indo-Aryan peoples
Gujarati-language writers
Cultural assimilation
Indian industrialists
Linguistic groups of the constitutionally recognised official languages of India